Scott Township is located in Ogle County, Illinois. As of the 2010 census, its population was 3,181 and it contained 1,104 housing units.

Geography

Demographics

References

External links 
City-data.com
Ogle County Official Site
Illinois State Archives

Townships in Ogle County, Illinois
Populated places established in 1849
Townships in Illinois
1849 establishments in Illinois